K. S. R. College of Arts and Science is located in Thiruchengode, Tamil Nadu, India.

External links

Colleges in Tamil Nadu
Education in Namakkal district